Satoshi Iwabuchi and Takao Suzuki were the defending champions, but lost in quarterfinals to Kevin Kim and Lee Hyung-taik.

Ashley Fisher and Tripp Phillips won the title by defeating Paul Goldstein and Jim Thomas 6–2, 7–5 in the final.

Seeds

Draw

Draw

References
 Main Draw

2006 Japan Open Tennis Championships